Jesse Carlyle "J. C." Snead (born October 14, 1940) is an American professional golfer who won tournaments on both the PGA Tour and Champions Tour. Snead is the nephew of hall of famer Sam Snead.

Snead, who prefers that people called him by his middle name, Carlyle, was born in Hot Springs, Virginia, where his father worked at The Homestead resort. He attended East Tennessee State University in Johnson City, Tennessee, where he was a member of Sigma Phi Epsilon fraternity. He played pro baseball in the Washington Senators farm system before becoming a professional golfer in 1964. He joined the PGA Tour in 1968.

Snead won eight tournaments on the PGA Tour, four on the Champions Tour, and one in international competition. He was a member of the 1971, 1973, and 1975 Ryder Cup teams. Snead's biggest career disappointment is that he never won a major championship on the PGA Tour; however, he made his career mark as one of the tour's most consistent players, with more than seven million dollars in career earnings. Snead recorded two runner-up finishes in majors: 2nd at 1973 Masters Tournament and in a tie for 2nd at the 1978 U.S. Open. He was also twice runner-up in The Players Championship, in 1974 and 1976, behind Jack Nicklaus on both occasions.

In 2003, Snead was inducted into the Virginia Sports Hall of Fame.

In his free time Snead enjoys hunting and farming. He has one son, Jason, who was born in 1978. He currently resides in Hobe Sound, Florida.

Professional wins (15)

PGA Tour wins (8)

PGA Tour playoff record (3–1)

PGA Tour of Australasia wins (1)

Other wins (1)

Senior PGA Tour wins (4)

Senior PGA Tour playoff record (2–3)

Other senior wins (2)
2011 Liberty Mutual Legends of Golf – Demaret Division (with Gibby Gilbert)
2012 Liberty Mutual Legends of Golf – Demaret Division (with Gibby Gilbert)

Results in major championships

Note: Snead never played in The Open Championship.

CUT = missed the half-way cut
DQ = disqualified
"T" indicates a tie for a place

Summary

Most consecutive cuts made – 14 (1973 PGA – 1979 Masters)
Longest streak of top-10s – 1 (four times)

Results in The Players Championship

CUT = missed the halfway cut
WD = withdrew
"T" indicates a tie for a place

Champions Tour major championships

Wins (1)

1 Won with birdie on the first playoff hole.

References

External links

American male golfers
East Tennessee State Buccaneers men's golfers
PGA Tour golfers
PGA Tour Champions golfers
Ryder Cup competitors for the United States
Winners of senior major golf championships
Golfers from Virginia
Golfers from Florida
Statesville Owls players
Middlesboro Senators players
Raleigh Capitals players
Geneva Senators players
People from Hot Springs, Virginia
People from Hobe Sound, Florida
1940 births
Living people